Huddersfield Town's 2001–02 campaign was their first competitive campaign in the third tier since the 1994–95 season. Huddersfield finished 6th that season, before losing in the play-offs to 3rd place Brentford, who Town beat in the play-off semi-finals in the 1994–95 season.

Squad at the start of the season

Review
Macari remained in charge for the 2001–02 season. At the start of the season he sold Chris Lucketti to Preston North End in a £750,000 deal, after 76 appearances for Town. Macari promoted the then 18-year-old Nathan Clarke to the first team, who would go on to be a mainstay at the heart of the Terriers defence. Huddersfield had a good start to the season, with the exception of the Worthington Cup loss to Rochdale. They continued a steady progress up the table and Lou Macari was on course to send Town back up to Division 1.

As the top six challenge faded, he made a canny loan signing, gifted young striker Leon Knight (from Chelsea). He scored 16 league goals in 31 appearances and also became the only loan player to date to win the Player of the Year award. However, Knight received a red card during a league game with near neighbours Oldham Athletic and ended up missing the Play-Offs he had been largely responsible for getting the team to. Without him, Town battled well but lacked a cutting edge and ended up being defeated by Brentford at the semi-final stage.

The season also saw a good campaign in the LDV Vans Trophy. After beating Halifax Town, Wrexham, Scunthorpe United and Hull City, Town played Blackpool in a 2-leg Northern Area Final. After losing the first leg 3–1 at Bloomfield Road, Town took a 2–0 lead in the reverse at the McAlpine Stadium, the match went to extra time, but their party was spoiled by Martin Bullock's golden goal.

So, Town looked on course for automatic promotion until a run of 4 games without a win in late March and early April, only the play-offs seemed to be likely to give the promotion that Town craved. They eventually finished 6th, six behind 2nd placed Reading.

The Play-off semi-final saw Town play 3rd placed Brentford. After the first leg ended 0–0 at the McAlpine, Andy Booth gave Town an early lead in the second leg at Griffin Park, before Darren Powell and Lloyd Owusu gave Brentford their 2–1 win.

Squad at the end of the season

Results

Division Two

Division 2 Play-offs

FA Cup

Worthington Cup

LDV Vans Trophy

Appearances and goals

Huddersfield Town A.F.C. seasons
Huddersfield Town